Tunica albuginea may refer to:

Tunica albuginea (penis), the tough fibrous layer of connective tissue that surrounds the corpora cavernosa of the penis
Tunica albuginea (testicles), a layer of connective tissue covering the testicles
Tunica albuginea (ovaries), the connective tissue covering of the ovaries
Tunica albuginea oculi, the tough fibrous layer that covers most of the eyeball.

See also
 Tunica (biology)

Biology disambiguation pages